Invasion of the Body Snatchas! is a 1983 horizontally scrolling shooter that was developed and published by Crystal Computing for the ZX Spectrum. Despite its name, it has no connection to the 1956 film and 1978 film of similar names. It is a clone of the arcade classic Defender.

Reception

Sinclair User, CRASH, and ZX Computing praised the game.

References

External links

Original source code  at Design Design

1983 video games
Horizontally scrolling shooters
Video game clones
Video games developed in the United Kingdom
ZX Spectrum games
ZX Spectrum-only games